Krzysztof Majerczak (1 February 1997) is a Polish slalom canoeist who has competed at the international level since 2014.

He won a bronze medal in the K1 team event at the 2019 ICF Canoe Slalom World Championships in La Seu d'Urgell. Krzysztof represented Poland in the K1 event at the delayed 2020 Summer Olympics in Tokyo, where he finished 15th after being eliminated in the semifinal.

References

External links

Living people
Polish male canoeists
1997 births
Medalists at the ICF Canoe Slalom World Championships
Canoeists at the 2020 Summer Olympics
Olympic canoeists of Poland